Rugotyphis is an extinct genus of sea snails, marine gastropod mollusks, in the family Muricidae, the murex snails or rock snails.

Species
Species within the genus Rugotyphis include:
 † Rugotyphis francescae (Finlay, 1924)
 † Rugotyphis secundus Vella, 1961
 † Rugotyphis vellai (Maxwell, 1971)

References

 Vella, P. (1961). Australasian Typhinae (Gastropoda) with notes on the subfamily. Palaeontology. 4 (3): 362-391.

 
Gastropods described in 1961